The Pittsburgh Symphony Orchestra (PSO) is an American orchestra based in Pittsburgh, Pennsylvania. The orchestra's home is Heinz Hall, located in Pittsburgh's Cultural District.

History
The Pittsburgh Symphony Orchestra is an American orchestra based in Pittsburgh, Pennsylvania. The orchestra's home is Heinz Hall for the Performing Arts, located in Pittsburgh's downtown Cultural District. The current music director is Austrian Manfred Honeck, who joined the orchestra in 2008, and the current president and CEO is Melia Tourangeau. 

The Pittsburgh Symphony Orchestra has a history of touring both domestically and internationally since 1900. The orchestra currently counts more than 36 international tours, including 20 to Europe, eight trips to the Far East and two to South America. The Pittsburgh Symphony was the first American orchestra to perform at the Vatican in January 2004 for the late Pope John Paul II, as part of the Pontiff's Silver Jubilee celebration.

The orchestra was founded by the Pittsburgh Arts Society with conductor Frederic Archer in 1895, who brought with him a number of musicians from the Boston Symphony Orchestra, and led the PSO in its first concert the following year.

1896–1910: Victor Herbert and Emil Paur
In 1898, Victor Herbert was chosen to lead the Orchestra. Victor Herbert was beginning to be known as a man of the theater, and had composed four comic operas, but at the time Pittsburgh engaged him he was better known as an ensemble and solo cellist, serious composer, and conductor (he was assistant to Anton Seidl of the New York Philharmonic Orchestra and leader of the internationally-celebrated band of the 22nd Regiment N.Y.S.N.G., popularly known as "Gilmore's Band" after its founder Patrick Sarsfield Gilmore). He was born in Ireland and educated in Germany.  A flamboyant conductor, he inspired musicians and audiences alike with his boundless enthusiasm. In its second season under Victor Herbert, the Orchestra received an invitation to perform two concerts at Carnegie Hall in New York City. Andrew Carnegie financed the trip. The Orchestra traveled at a more frequent rate under Herbert's tenure, performing in Boston, Chicago, Washington, D.C., and Canada. Its personnel included some important musicians: Luigi von Kunits, later the first conductor of the Toronto Symphony Orchestra, as concertmaster; Frederick William Stahlberg in the first violins and John Stepan Zamecnik in the second violins; Gaston Borch as principal cello; Paul Henneberg as first flute; and Leon Medaer as first clarinet.

Herbert composed two substantial orchestral works that the Pittsburgh Orchestra premiered, his Suite romantique op. 31 (which he also dedicated to the orchestra) and the tone poem Hero and Leander op. 33. Under Herbert's direction, the Pittsburgh Orchestra played as part of the Pan-American Exposition at the 1901 World's Fair in Buffalo, New York, for which Herbert had also composed an original work for the Exhibition titled "Panamericana: Morceau Characteristique" for the Orchestra to perform.

He ended his appointment with the Pittsburgh Symphony Orchestra in 1904 because of increasingly strident disagreements with the Orchestra's manager, George H. Wilson, who disliked Herbert's populist manner and personally despised him. When Herbert left the orchestra in 1904, the Symphony Society chose as his successor a man who could not have been more different.

Austrian conductor Emil Paur took an intellectual approach to his work and avoided theatrics. Trained as a violinist, he had served as conductor of both the Boston Symphony Orchestra and the New York Philharmonic as well as guest conductor throughout Europe and held the Pittsburgh Orchestra to the same exacting standards. Paur's programs emphasized the classical repertoire and included a heavy dose of Johannes Brahms, whose music was considered too challenging for most audiences at that time. Additionally, Paur clashed with many of the Orchestra's musicians when he prohibited them from accepting outside performing engagements and continued to hire mainly European musicians. Manager George H. Wilson resigned in disgust over Paur on 24 December 1906, shortly after the beginning of Paur's third season, saying that his tenure, pride, and pleasure with the orchestra "have all constrained me during the past two years to bear with the personal idiosyncracies, the superficiality of his musical faith, the narrowness of his musical horizon, his indifference to the success of the out-of-town concerts, the hazard (to Orchestra business) of an uncontrolled temper, the frequent distrust of my motives, and the peculiar and ever-shifting focus of the stupidity of the present Conductor...these things are characteristic of the man, not passing symptoms." Paur remained at the head of the Orchestra until it disbanded in 1910.

The orchestra attracted a number of prominent guest conductors during these early years, including Edward Elgar and Richard Strauss.

1910–1926: Hard times
Despite lavish praise from critics and a growing national reputation, hard times lay ahead for the Orchestra. The Panic of 1907 had an immediate impact on the ability and the resolve of the wealthy to support cultural organizations throughout the country. The city of Pittsburgh proved to be no exception. To make matters worse, Paur's practice of hiring European musicians damaged relations with local musicians to the point where half of the orchestra's members refused to renew their contracts for the 1908–09 season. Subscriptions declined in the wake of the controversy.

By 1910, the Orchestra's future was in immediate jeopardy. The original guarantors had conceived of the orchestra as a self-sustaining institution. In reality, they spent more than $1 million to subsidize the organization in its first 15 years. A new approach was clearly needed and a plan was developed to raise an endowment. When insufficient funds were forthcoming, the orchestra canceled its upcoming season. No one suspected that 16 years would pass before Pittsburgh could resurrect its symphony orchestra. In the interim, concert promoter May Beegle founded the Pittsburgh Orchestra Association to bring other musical performers to the city.

1926–1938: The New Pittsburgh Symphony Orchestra
It took 16 years, but on May 2, 1926, the dream of a new Pittsburgh Orchestra finally became reality. The players took part in 14 unpaid rehearsals and contributed $25 each to sponsor a free public concert of the new Pittsburgh Symphony Orchestra under the direction of Richard Hageman with concertmaster and associate conductor Elias Breeskin as soloist in the Bruch violin concerto.

Following the newly restructured Orchestra's successful debut, the Symphony Society organized a Sunday concert series that began on April 24, 1927. Sunday was chosen because most of the players were under contract with theater orchestras during the week. The following Monday, nine board members were arrested for violating the Pennsylvania Blue Laws, which forbade secular music-making on the Sabbath. The publicity didn't hurt the Pittsburgh Symphony. The board's fight to keep the series alive whetted the public's appetite for symphony concerts.

In 1930, Antonio Modarelli assumed his post as the music director of the Orchestra. He had spent the previous eight years in Berlin composing and conducting, and was the only American composer to be elected to the prestigious "Society of German Composers." A German newspaper described his conducting as "forceful, authentic, modern music" and he was invited to conduct in Moscow. He was music director until 1937, but he never quite won the whole-hearted acceptance of Pittsburgh audiences, in part because he was a local boy, born in nearby Braddock. He had taught at Duquesne University and been a band leader in the Navy prior to his work in Europe and with the Symphony.

In 1936, the Symphony's concerts were broadcast nationally for the first time. Pittsburgh Plate Glass sponsored 26 programs, which were carried over every major radio station east of Denver. Several internationally known guest conductors were invited to lead the Orchestra during the 1937–38 season, among them Carlos Chavez, Eugene Goossens and Fritz Reiner. This program of frequent guest conductors was made in an effort to restore the symphony to its "golden years," but in effect demoted Modarelli and is cited as the reason for his resignation in 1937.

In 1937, the Pittsburgh Symphony Orchestra engaged renowned German conductor Otto Klemperer to reorganize and expand the Orchestra. A born teacher, he is credited with turning the Orchestra into a power to be reckoned with in just six weeks. After leaving Germany during the rise of the Nazi party, he had become the music director of the Los Angeles Philharmonic. He is responsible for bringing in much new talent while working with the Musicians' Union to hire both local and imported performers. Since then, the orchestra has experienced ongoing growth and development, including building a substantial endowment fund.

1938–1948: The Reiner years

The Pittsburgh Symphony enjoyed 10 prolific years with Fritz Reiner as music director. Native to Hungary, Reiner had studied with Hungarian composer Béla Bartók and interpreted many of his pieces in Symphony performances. An uncompromising conductor, Reiner extracted precise articulation and phrasing from his players. The Orchestra's reputation grew dramatically, netting the ensemble a high-profile recording contract with Columbia Corporation, a division of CBS, and an invitation to perform abroad.

Reiner had a volatile temper and demanded perfection from his players. He had a tiny beat which forced the musicians to remain alert at all times. At one rehearsal a bass player put a telescope to his eye. When he explained to Reiner that he was "trying to find the beat," the conductor fired him on the spot.

Females joined the Orchestra for the first time during World War II. Eighteen joined in 1942 and 24 more in 1944. The PSO had more female performers than any other major American symphony during the war.

Reiner left the Orchestra in 1948 to conduct at the Metropolitan Opera in New York City and went on to conduct the Chicago Symphony Orchestra. From 1948 to 1952, the Orchestra played under various guest conductors, including Leopold Stokowski, Leonard Bernstein, Erich Leinsdorf, Charles Munch, Paul Paray and Victor de Sabata.

De Sabata came to Pittsburgh in 1948 in part because of the urgings of his colleague Vladimir Bakaleinikoff whom he had conducted in Cincinnati in 1927. Ticket sales exploded with de Sabata at the helm. He was so popular with local audiences that around 1,200 people attended a concert he conducted at the Syria Mosque during one of Pittsburgh's worst snowstorms.  He returned to conduct the orchestra in 1949, 1950, and 1951. The orchestra established a Guest Conductor Chair in his name in 2010.

1952–1976: The Steinberg years

In its 23 years under the direction of William Steinberg, the Pittsburgh Symphony Orchestra remained a superb ensemble and developed an eager and devoted following. By 1961, audiences had increased 250 percent. What's more, in the five preceding years, the Pittsburgh Symphony was the only American orchestra to sell out all its concerts by season tickets.

Steinberg's talents had long been recognized by some of the world's greatest conductors. As a protégé of Otto Klemperer, Steinberg had a glamorous career in his homeland of Germany before fleeing the Nazis in 1936. Arturo Toscanini invited him to organize the newly formed Palestine Orchestra in Tel Aviv (today's Israel Philharmonic Orchestra) and, in 1937, to become his associate conductor at the NBC Symphony Orchestra. Steinberg went on to direct the Buffalo Philharmonic before becoming music director of the Pittsburgh Symphony in 1952. The Boston Symphony Orchestra engaged him as music director from 1969 to 1972, a post he held concurrently with his Pittsburgh Symphony position.

During the early part of the 1950s, the Symphony played a number of "industry concerts". These concerts where conducted by Steinberg and were sponsored by area industries, specifically the United Steelworkers of America. The sponsorship offset costs for industry workers and the Symphony performed in more convenient locations throughout Pennsylvania, Ohio, and West Virginia. The Symphony continued to bring music to smaller communities in partnership with Manufacturers Heat and Light Company and Columbia Gas during the Steinberg era.  

On August 14, 1964, the Pittsburgh Symphony embarked on an 11-week, 24,000-mile tour to 14 nations in Europe and the Near East. Sponsored by the U.S. State Department, the tour earned Pittsburgh a reputation for producing more than steel and elevated the image of American culture abroad. The Pittsburgh Symphony Orchestra performed for audiences in Warsaw, Madrid, Berlin, Zagreb, Reykjavik, and 15 other locations throughout Europe and the Middle East during the State Department tour.

Many of the Orchestra's earlier recordings were made in the Syria Mosque with labels such as Capitol Records and Columbia Records. The Pittsburgh Symphony performed at the Syria Mosque from 1926 until 1971. The building was torn down in 1992 to the dismay of many who had attended concerts there. 

William Steinberg and the Pittsburgh Symphony made a number of highly acclaimed recordings for the Command label starting in 1962.  These recordings were made in the Soldiers and Sailors Memorial Hall in Pittsburgh.  The technical superiority of the Command recordings was aided by the company's use of 35mm film as the recording medium. 

The opening of Heinz Hall on September 10, 1971 marked the completion of an 11-year campaign, initiated by H.J. Heinz II. The resplendent concert hall stands as a testimonial to the civic spirit that has supported Pittsburgh's cultural organizations since the turn of the twentieth century.

Steinberg conducted his final Pittsburgh Symphony Orchestra concerts as Music Director in 1976, after which he returned to conduct occasionally as Music Director Emeritus.

1976–1984: The Previn years

In addition to his considerable talents as a conductor, André Previn brought to the Pittsburgh Symphony his virtuosity at the piano and a musical sensibility shaped in Hollywood. He began studying piano in his native Berlin at the age of six before the rise of the Nazi regime sent his family first to Paris and later to Los Angeles. In his teenage years, he began composing, arranging and conducting film scores. The four-time Academy Award-winner developed an equally successful career as a jazz pianist before turning to conducting in 1960. In 1968, he was appointed principal conductor of the London Symphony Orchestra. He held that post until 1979, having already assumed the music directorship of the Pittsburgh Symphony Orchestra in 1976.

Previn had a collegial working style with symphony musicians and even formed a chamber music trio with Herbert Greenberg, associate concertmaster, and principal cellist, Anne Martindale Williams around 1979. In 1981, Previn renewed his contract with the symphony orchestra.

During this time, Victoria Bond served as affiliate conductor of the Pittsburgh Symphony Orchestra from 1978 to 1980. Bond was the first woman to earn a doctoral degree in orchestral conducting from the Juilliard School and is a prolific composer.  While at the Pittsburgh Symphony, she also served as the music director of the Pittsburgh Youth Symphony and the New Amsterdam Symphony in New York City.

Previn often brought jazz to the concert hall. In February 1977, the Pittsburgh Symphony Orchestra and Previn made their national debut on PBS with eight specials, Previn and the Pittsburgh. The Alcoa Foundation sponsored the Emmy-nominated program, which ran for three years. Guests on the program included John Williams, Ella Fitzgerald and Oscar Peterson.

Previn left the Pittsburgh Symphony Orchestra in 1984, but is credited with "renewing the stature of the orchestra, (expanding) its position in the community, (and giving) the city a positive image internationally…"

1984–1996: The Maazel years

Long acknowledged to be one of America's great orchestras, the Pittsburgh Symphony developed an unrivaled international following during its years under Lorin Maazel. The orchestra gained further stature as Maazel led tours of Europe, Asia and the Americas, added first-rank players to vital positions, and programmed season-long retrospectives that appealed to audiences and critics alike.

Following Previn's departure in 1984, Maazel agreed to act as music consultant while the orchestra sought a permanent music director.  He was offered and accepted that position in 1988, having already dazzled the world and won the hearts of the players in the course of numerous guest appearances and three acclaimed tours.

For Maazel, the journey back to Pittsburgh was a homecoming. His family settled here while he was still a young child so he could continue to study with his conducting teacher, Vladimir Bakaleinikov, who had become associate conductor of the Pittsburgh Symphony in 1939.

Maazel later joined the Orchestra as a violinist and apprentice conductor while studying at the University of Pittsburgh. His career soon took him to Europe where in 1960 he became the first American invited to direct at the Bayreuth Festival. He went on to become music director of the Deutsche Oper, the Cleveland Orchestra, the Orchestre National de France and the Vienna Opera before returning to Pittsburgh. In 1993, he assumed an additional music directorship, as artistic head of the Bavarian Radio Symphony Orchestra in Munich. The musical legacy of Maazel's artistic leadership is an orchestra built upon the multifaceted talents of virtuosic players.

Also under Maazel's direction, the Pittsburgh Symphony commissioned several works to showcase principal players. The first was the Benjamin Lees' Horn Concerto, which premiered on May 14, 1992 and was performed later that year on the Pittsburgh Symphony's European tour by William Caballero. Four commissions followed: Ellen Taaffe Zwilich's Concerto for Bassoon and Orchestra for Nancy Goeres, Leonardo Balada's Music for Oboe and Orchestra for Cynthia Koledo DeAlmeida, Rodion Shchedrin's Concerto for Trumpet and Orchestra for George Vosburgh, Roberto Sierra's Evocaciones and Concerto for Violin and Orchestra, and David Stock's Violin Concerto for Andrés Cárdenes.

The orchestra has produced many recordings with Maazel, among them a complete cycle devoted to the works of Sibelius. The Pittsburgh Symphony Orchestra won a Grammy Award for its 1992 recording with Yo-Yo Ma of works for cello and orchestra.

Maazel announced in 1995 that he would be leaving his post as music director of the Pittsburgh Symphony Orchestra in 1996. He explained that his departure would give him more time to work on composition. In addition to developing his compositional work, Maazel went on to direct and conduct for the New York Philharmonic along with several orchestras abroad. After his death in July 2014, the Pittsburgh Symphony performed memorial pieces for Maazel as well as created a multimedia exhibit featuring Symphony archival materials related to the late director.

Marvin Hamlisch served as principal pops conductor beginning in 1995 until his death in 2012.

1995–2004: The second century

A capital campaign was launched in 1993 to increase the Pittsburgh Symphony's endowment by $70 million.

On April 10, 1995, the orchestra announced the appointment of Mariss Jansons to succeed Maazel in 1996 as its eighth music director. Latvian born, Jansons was well received by critics and audiences in Pittsburgh who applauded the "warmth and humanity" that he brought to the ensemble.  In addition to directing the Pittsburgh Symphony Orchestra, Jansons also served as an influential music director for the Oslo Philharmonic Orchestra in Norway until 2002.  With Jansons, the Pittsburgh Symphony toured all over the world, introducing it to new audiences, and recorded extensively. During this time, the Symphony was "innovative in drawing new elements of the Pittsburgh region’s population to concerts in Heinz Hall and elsewhere." Jansons conducted his last year as music director of the Symphony during the 2003–2004 season after which he began acting as director of the Bavarian Radio Symphony Orchestra in Munich.

Also, in 1995, the orchestra welcomed Marvin Hamlisch as its first principal pops conductor. Composer of more than 40 motion picture scores and the Pulitzer Prize-winning Broadway show A Chorus Line, Hamlisch previously appeared as guest conductor of symphony orchestras around the world. With three Oscars, four Grammys, a Tony Award and three Golden Globe Awards to his credit, Hamlisch eagerly began exploring new avenues of music-making with the Pittsburgh Symphony Orchestra.

In January 2004, the Pittsburgh Symphony Orchestra with conductor Gilbert Levine became the first American orchestra to perform at the Vatican for Pope John Paul II to commemorate the Pontiff's Silver Jubilee celebration and his lifelong commitment to interfaith understanding and outreach of the Abrahamic faiths. The Pittsburgh Symphony was joined by the London Philharmonic Choir, Kraków Philharmonic Choir, Ankara Polyphonic Choir and members of the Mendelssohn Choir of Pittsburgh in a program that included the world premiere of "Abraham," a sacred motet by John Harbison, and Mahler Symphony No. 2 "Resurrection. The event, which was attended by the Pontiff, Rav Elio Toaff, Imam Abdulawahab Hussein Gomaa, and 7,000 invited guests, was telecast on RAI, on PBS, and throughout the world, and released on DVD by WQED Multimedia, Pittsburgh.  Subsequent to this concert, at Levine's impetus, the Pittsburgh Symphony founded a series of concerts entitled "Music for the Spirit." He led the first two of these, performances of the Haydn "Creation and Mahler Symphony No. 3, in Pittsburgh in 2006.

2005–2007: The team for the times

In 2005, the PSO entered a new era with the 2005–2006 season introducing its innovative model for artistic leadership. During this time, a new collective bargaining agreement was in effect, which gave the musicians increased authority over matters of running the orchestra such as the hiring of musicians and choice of repertoire. Starting in 2005, Sir Andrew Davis served as the PSO artistic advisor, with Yan Pascal Tortelier as principal guest conductor and Marek Janowski holding the "endowed guest conductor chair."

Sir Andrew Davis, while providing overall programming input regarding the entire season and leading the orchestra in a variety of styles, paid special attention to the music of British and American composers. Davis had been an organ scholar before becoming a conductor. Under his direction, the Symphony performed many symphonic, operatic and choral works ranging from baroque to contemporary. Davis, a Knight Bachelor of Great Britain and music director of the Lyric Opera of Chicago, had previously led the Pittsburgh Symphony several times as a guest conductor between 1977 and 1990.

Yan Pascal Tortelier focused on French composers and hidden treasures of the 20th century along with music of the 21st century. Marek Janowski had a relationship with the orchestra since 1991, conducting the great masters of the German-Austrian repertoire that have been central to the identity of the orchestra since the days of former Music Director William Steinberg.

Davis was originally scheduled to step down after the 2007–2008 season, but in October 2007, Davis and the Pittsburgh Symphony mutually agreed to terminate his contract early and for him not to conduct his scheduled concerts in the 2007–2008 season because of increased demands on Davis' schedule. The contracts of Tortelier and Janowski also expired in 2008. Janowski now holds the Otto Klemperer Guest Conductor Chair with the PSO.

2008 to the present: Manfred Honeck

In a change of conductor leadership format, returning to the traditional music director hierarchy, the PSO announced on January 24, 2007, that with the 2008–2009 season, the Austrian conductor Manfred Honeck would become the PSO's ninth music director. Honeck first conducted the symphony in May 2006, and returned for another guest appearance in November 2006.  His initial contract was for three years.  In September 2009, the PSO announced the extension of Honeck's contract to the 2015–2016 season. In February 2012, the PSO announced the further extension of Honeck's contract through the 2019–2020 season. In June 2007, the orchestra announced the appointment of American conductor Leonard Slatkin as the orchestra's principal guest conductor, as of the 2008–2009 season.

Austrian born, Honeck studied music at the Academy of Music in Vienna. He performed in various capacities with the Vienna Philharmonic Orchestra—as violinist, violist and guest conductor. In addition to his directorship of the Pittsburgh Symphony, Honeck has served as music director of the Swedish Radio Symphony Orchestra and Staatsoper Stuttgart and as guest conductor of the Czech Philharmonic.

In November 2006, the PSO announced a pledge of $29.5 million from the Richard P. Simmons family as the start of a capital challenge for the orchestra to address long-standing financial concerns. In December 2006, the PSO announced the launch of an $80 million capital fund-raising drive, after the initial $29.5-million boost from the Simmons family. In March 2009, the PSO announced the discontinuation of its chamber orchestra series after the 2008–2009 season, along with staff reductions of 9 positions.

In May 2009, Honeck and the Pittsburgh Symphony embarked on a tour to Asia. The first international tour with Honeck as music director marked the Orchestra's debut in Shanghai, China and Kaohsiung, Taiwan, and the Orchestra's first performance in Beijing since 1987. In fall 2009, Honeck and the orchestra were invited to close the prestigious Lucerne Festival in Lucerne, Switzerland. In September 2009, the Pittsburgh Symphony and Honeck agreed to extend his contract through the 2015–2016 season.  In 2013, his contract was extended to the 2019–2020 season.

In May 2010, Honeck and the Pittsburgh Symphony completed a remarkable tour of Europe. The 12-concert BNY Mellon 2010 European Tour included concerts at Vienna's famed Musikverein, as well as performances in Switzerland, Germany, Luxembourg, France, Czech Republic, Hungary and Slovenia. In September 2010, the Pittsburgh Symphony and Honeck announced the creation of the Victor de Sabata Guest Conductor Chair for conductor Gianandrea Noseda for four years, beginning with the 2010–11 season.

In August and September 2013, Honeck and the Pittsburgh Symphony Orchestra returned to Europe, this time for a European Festivals tour that included Grafenegg, Lucerne, Beethovenfest in Bonn and several others.

Music directors and other artistic leaders

Musicians
Music Director
Manfred Honeck
Associate Conductor

Andrés Franco
Earl Lee

First Violin

Mark Huggins: Associate Concertmaster; Beverlynn & Steven Elliott Chair
Huei-Sheng Kao: Assistant Concertmaster
Kelsey Blumenthal
Ellen Chen-Livingston: Selma Wiener Berkman Memorial Chair
Irene Cheng
Sarah Clendenning
Alison Peters Fujito: Olga T. Gazalie Chair
Marta Krechkovsky
Justine Lamb-Budge
Jennifer Orchard: Ron & Dorothy Chutz Chair
Susanne Park
Christopher Wu: Nancy & Jeffery Leininger Chair
Kristina Yoder
Second Violin

Jeremy Black: G. Christian Lantzsch & Duquesne Light Company Chair (Principal)
Louis Lev: The Morrison Family Chair (Associate principal)
Dennis O’Boyle (Assistant principal)
Laura Motchalov: William & Sarah Galbraith Chair
Eva Burmeister
Carolyn Edwards
Andrew Fuller
Lorien Benet Hart
Claudia Mahave: Alice Victoria Gelormino Chair
Zhan Shu
Albert Tan
Ken Johnston: 2018–2019 Season Musician

Viola
Randolph Kelly: Cynthia S. Calhoun Chair (principal) 
Tatjana Mead Chamis (associate principal)
Joen Vasquez (assistant principal)
Marylène Gingras-Roy
Penny Anderson Brill: Michael & Carol Bleier Chair
Laura Fuller
Meredith Kufchak
Erina Laraby-Goldwasser
Paul Silver: Mr. & Mrs. Willard J. Tillotson Jr. Chair
Stephanie Tretick
Andrew Wickesberg: Mr. & Mrs. Martin G. McGunn Chair 
Aaron Mossburg: 2018–2019 Season Musician

Cello
Anne Martindale Williams: Pittsburgh Symphony Association Chair (principal)
David Premo: Donald I. & Janet Moritz and Equitable Resources, Inc. Chair (associate principal)
Adam Liu: George & Eileen Dorman Chair (assistant principal)
Mikhail Istomin
Bronwyn Banerdt
Will Chow
Michael De Bruyn
Michael Lipman: Jane & Rae Burton Chair
Charlie Powers
Alexandra Thompson
Karissa Shivone
Bass
Brandon McLean  (Acting principal)
Betsy Heston: United States Steel Corporation Chair (assistant principal)
Joseph Campagna 
Jeffrey Grubbs
Peter Guild
Micah Howard: Stephen & Kimberly Keen Chair
John Moore
Aaron White
Paul Matz: 2018–2019 Season Musician

Harp
Gretchen Van Hoesen: Virginia Campbell Chair (Principal)
Flute
Lorna Mcghee: Jackman Pfouts Flute Chair (Principal)
Jennifer Steele: Hilda M. Willis Foundation Chair
Piccolo
Rhian Kenny: Frank & Loti Gaffney Chair (Principal)
Oboe
Cynthia Koledo DeAlmeida: Dr. William Larimer Mellon Jr. Chair (Principal)
Max Blair (Associate Principal)
Scott Bell: Dr. & Mrs. William E. Rinehart Chair
English Horn
Harold Smoliar: Johannes & Mona L. Coetzee Memorial Chair (Principal)
Clarinet
Michael Rusinek: Mr. & Mrs. Aaron Silberman Chair (Principal)
Victoria Luperi (Co-principal)
Ron Samuels
E-Flat Clarinet
Victoria Luperi
Bass Clarinet
Jack Howell
Bassoon
Nancy Goeres: Mr. & Mrs. William Genge And Mr. & Mrs. James E. Lee Chair (Principal)
David Sogg (Co-principal)
Philip A. Pandolfi
Contrabassoon
James Rodgers (principal)
Horn
William Caballero: Anonymous Donor Chair (Principal)
Stephen Kostyniak (Associate principal)
Zachary Smith: Thomas H. & Frances M. Witmer Chair (Assistant principal)
Robert Lauver: Irving (Buddy) Wechsler Chair
Mark Houghton
Joseph Rounds: Reed Smith Chair Honoring Tom Todd
Trumpet
Micah Wilkinson: Martha Brooks Robinson Chair (Principal)
Charles Lirette: Edward D. Loughney Chair (Co-principal)
Neal Berntsen 
Chad Winkler: Susan S. Greer Memorial Chair
Trombone
Peter Sullivan: Tom & Jamee Todd Chair (Principal)
Rebecca Cherian (Co-principal)
James Nova
Bass Trombone
Jeffrey Dee (Principal)
Tuba
Craig Knox (Principal)
Timpani
Christopher Allen (Associate principal)
Percussion
Andrew Reamer: Albert H. Eckert Chair (Principal)
Jeremy Branson (Associate principal)
Christopher Allen
Shawn Galvin: 2018–2019 Season Musician

Librarians
Lisa Gedris: Jean & Sigo Falk Chair (Principal)
Grant Johnson: Assistant Librarian

Tour history
1947 Tour of Mexico

Fritz Reiner conducted the Pittsburgh Symphony Orchestra during its 1947 tour of Mexico. During the six-week tour, the Pittsburgh Symphony performed 37 concerts in 27 cities in the southern United States and Mexico. The symphony played six concerts in Mexico City at the Palacio de las Bellas Artes and one concert in Monterrey. While on tour, Reiner played the role of ambassador of the arts for the United States.

1964 Tour of Europe and the Near East

William Steinberg conducted the Pittsburgh Symphony Orchestra during its 1964 tour of Europe and what was then referred to as the Near East. This tour marked the symphony's first international tour outside of North America. The State Department funded the 11-week tour from August 10 to November 1, which included performances in Rome, Athens, Beirut, Baalbeck, Tehran, Lucerne, Edinburgh, Luxembourg, Frankfurt, Berlin, Warwas, Kraków, Katowice, Lodz, Belgrade, Sarajevo, Ljubljana, Zagreb, Munich, Turin, Florence, Bilbao, Madrid, Barcelona, Lisbon, Oporto and Reykjavik. Soloists included pianists Jerome Lowenthal and Byron Janis, violinists Manoug Parikian and Charles Treger, Pittsburgh Symphony principal flautist Bernard Z. Goldberg and baritone Dietrich Fischer-Dieskau. The Pittsburgh Symphony was one of the last American orchestras to perform in Iran to date.

1973 Tour of Japan, Alaska, and Oregon

William Steinberg and Associate Conductor Donald Johanos conducted the Pittsburgh Symphony Orchestra on its 1973 tour of Japan, Alaska and Oregon from April 7 to 26. While in Japan, the orchestra participated in the 1973 Osaka Music Festival and also performed in Tokyo, Nagoya and Yahata. Performances in Osaka were aired on television and national radio.

1978 European Tour

Andre Previn conducted the Pittsburgh Symphony Orchestra on its 1978 tour of Europe from May 21 to June 10. The three-week tour saw the orchestra perform in Austria (Vienna, Linz, Innsbruck), Germany (Munich, Stuttgart, Bonn, Frankfurt, Berlin, Hanover), Sweden (Goteborg, Stockholm), Bergen, Norway and London, England. The orchestra was sent off with a festive ceremony of dance performances and well wishes at the Heinz Hall Plaza.

1980 Mexico City

The Pittsburgh Symphony Orchestra toured in Mexico from August 25 to 31 under the direction of Andre Previn. Eduardo Mata and Rafael Fruhbeck de Burgos guest conducted the orchestra. The symphony performed in Mexico City at three venues: Sala de Conciertos Nezahualcóyotl (August 26 and 28), Teatro de la Ciudad (August 27 and 29) and Auditorio Nacional (August 30). Soloists included Horacio Gutierrez, Nathaniel Rosen and Guadalupe Parrondo.

1982 European Tour

Andre Previn conducted the Pittsburgh Symphony Orchestra on its 1982 tour of Europe from May 23 to June 13. The orchestra visited Bonn, Linz, Vienna, Zurich, Munich, Stuttgart, Frankfurt, Düsseldorf, Paris, Brussels, Berlin and London.

1984 Hong Kong Festival

Andre Previn and Sir Michael Tippett conducted the Pittsburgh Symphony at the 1984 Hong Kong Arts Festival. Soloists included pianist Ken Noda, violinist Yuzuko Horigome and violist Randolph Kelly.
 
1984 Casals Festival in Puerto Rico

Herbert Blomstedt of the Dresden State and Swedish Radio orchestras conducted the Pittsburgh Symphony Orchestra in four concerts at the Casals Festival in Puerto Rico, June 1984. The symphony performed four concerts with piano soloists Antonio Meneses and Garrick Ohlsen. This tour marked the symphony's first appearance at the Casals Festival.

1985 European Tour

Lorin Maazel conducted the Pittsburgh Symphony Orchestra during its 1985 European Tour from August 14 to September 8. The tour included performances at music festivals in Salzburg and Edinburgh. The symphony also performed in Dublin, Cork, London, Bristol, Zurich, Lucerne, Montreux, Bonn, Düsseldorf, Berlin, Brussels, Antwerp and Paris.

1987 Far East Tour

Lorin Maazel conducted the Pittsburgh Symphony Orchestra during its 1987 Far East Tour of China and Japan. from April 14 to May 4. The symphony was one of only a few U.S. orchestras to have visited China at the time. The orchestra toured in Beijing, Hong Kong and several cities in Japan including Tokyo, Yokohama, Osaka, Nagoya and Matsudo. Pianist Patricia Prattis Jennings performed Gershwin's Concerto in F with the Pittsburgh Symphony to high acclaim at festivals in Hong Kong, Osaka and Tokyo.

1987 Edinburgh Festival

Lorin Maazel and Michael Tilson Thomas conducted the Pittsburgh Symphony at the Edinburgh Festival in August 1987. The orchestra was the first U.S. orchestra to ever be designated the resident orchestra of the festival. Pianist Patricia Prattis Jennings performed Gershwin's Concerto in F with the symphony to high acclaim at the festival.

1989 Tour of Soviet Union, Poland and Western Europe

Lorin Maazel conducted the Pittsburgh Symphony Orchestra on its 1989 tour of the Soviet Union, Poland and Western Europe. This tour marked the European premieres of Marc Neikrug's Flute Concerto and George Rochberg's Symphony No. 6. The orchestra performed in Leningrad, Moscow, Warsaw, Geneva, Paris, Milan, Rome, Amsterdam, Cologne, Berlin, Hamburg, Hanover and London.

1991 Tour of Japan, Hong Kong and Taiwan

Director Lorin Maazel conducted the Pittsburgh Symphony on its tour of Japan, Hong Kong and Taiwan from May 14 to June 5, 1991. This tour marked the symphony's debut in Taiwan. The Pittsburgh Symphony Orchestra performed in Tokyo, Omiya, Osaka, Musashino, Hong Kong and Taipei.

1992 European Tour to Major Music Capitals

Director Lorin Maazel conducted the Pittsburgh Symphony Orchestra on its tour of major European music capitals, May 18 to June 9, 1992. The orchestra performed in Hamburg, Munich, Frankfurt, Paris, Madrid, Barcelona, Vienna, Stuttgart, Bonn, Brussels, Birmingham and London.

1992 European Tour to Major Summer Music Festivals

Lorin Maazel conducted the Pittsburgh Symphony on its European tour of summer music festivals from August 5–29, 1992. The symphony performed at the Festival Internacional de Santander in Seville, Spain, and at music festivals in Mérida, Pollensa, Wiesbaden, Frankfurt, Montreux, Stresa, Verona, Lecce, Catania and Torino.

1993 Tour to California & Mexico

Director Lorin Maazel conducted the Pittsburgh Symphony on its tour of California and Mexico, April 25 to May 9, 1993. The orchestra performed the opening concerts of the Chivas Regal Latin American Tour in Mexico City.

1993 Tour to South America

Director Lorin Maazel conducted the Pittsburgh Symphony on its first-ever tour of South America, May 24 to June 9, 1993. The orchestra performed in Brazil, Venezuela and Argentina.

1995 Casals Festival

Director Lorin Maazel conducted the Pittsburgh Symphony in the 1995 Casals Festival in Puerto Rico.

1995 Tour of Japan and Korea

Director Lorin Maazel conducted the Pittsburgh Symphony Orchestra on its tour of Japan and Korea, May 16 to June 4, 1995. This tour marked the symphony's first visit to Korea. The symphony performed a benefit concert in Japan's Kobe Green Arena for victims of the January 1995 earthquake. The 11-concert tour brought the orchestra to Tokyo, Nagoya, Osaka, Seoul, Kita-Kryushu and Kobe.

1996 International Centennial Tour

Director Lorin Maazel conducted the Pittsburgh Symphony Orchestra on its International Centennial tour, January 29 to February 22.  The orchestra performed 15 concerts in 12 cities as part of the orchestra's 100th anniversary celebrations. The symphony was invited to participate in the city of Jerusalem's 3,000th anniversary with the Israeli premiere of "Magreffa," a work by Israeli composer Ari Ben-Shabetai and commissioned by the symphony. There were additional concerts in Vienna, Frankfurt, Madrid, Barcelona, Paris, Amsterdam and London. The Pittsburgh Symphony also made debut performances in the Canary Islands.

1998 Tour of Japan

Director Mariss Jansons conducted the Pittsburgh Symphony Orchestra on its tour of Japan from May 12 to 28, 1998. This tour marked Jansons' inaugural tour with the symphony. The orchestra performed seven concerts in Sapporo, Nagoya, Himeji, Osaka and Tokyo.

1998 U.S. and Canada Tour with Andrea Bocelli

The PSO performed in the U.S. and Canada with soloist Andrea Bocelli. Steven Mercurio conducted the orchestra during concerts in New York and New Jersey.

1999 European Festivals Tour

Director Mariss Jansons conducted the Pittsburgh Symphony Orchestra on its tour of European Festivals from August 12 to September 5, 1999. This tour marked the symphony's first European tour with Jansons. The symphony performed a total of 15 concerts in Dublin, Edinburgh, Salzburg, Copenhagen, London, Frankfurt, Wiesbaden, Lucerne, Baden-Baden, Stuttgart, Cologne, Berlin and Düsseldorf.

2000 European Residency Tour

Director Mariss Jansons conducted the Pittsburgh Symphony on its European Residency tour, May 15 to June 4, 2000. The symphony performed three concerts at the Musikverein in Vienna and performed 11 more concerts in Madrid, Valencia, Amsterdam, Brussels, London and Birmingham.

2001 South American Tour

Director Mariss Jansons conducted the Pittsburgh Symphony Orchestra on its second tour to South America in July 2001. The orchestra played five concerts in São Paulo, Montevideo, and Buenos Aires. The tour was hampered by financial and logistical problems, causing the orchestra to drop three concerts and a previously planned stop in Rio de Janeiro.

2002 Far East Tour

Director Mariss Jansons conducted the Pittsburgh Symphony Orchestra during its tour of the Far East from February 18 to March 9, 2002. This tour marked the symphony's first foray into Malaysia and Australia. The orchestra performed in Osaka, Tokyo, Yokohama, Kuala Lumpur, Sydney and Melbourne. The tour was sponsored by FreeMarkets.

2003 Mellon Pittsburgh Symphony European Tours

Conductor Mariss Jansons led the Pittsburgh Symphony Orchestra on two tours of Europe in 2003 sponsored by the Mellon Financial Corporation. During the spring leg of the tour (April 3–13), the symphony performed in Valencia, Madrid, Vienna, Amsterdam and London. During the summer leg of the tour (August 21–30), the symphony performed in Lucerne, Salzburg, Ludwigsburg and London, with the final performance at the Royal Albert Hall. The orchestra performed 14 concerts in total.

January 17, 2004 The Pontiff's Silver Jubilee Celebration

Gilbert Levine conducted the Pittsburgh Symphony Orchestra during the Pontiff's Silver Jubilee celebration, also referred to as the Papal Concert of Reconciliation, commemorating Pope John Paul II's 25th election anniversary on January 17, 2004. The symphony was the first U.S. orchestra to perform for a Pope at the Vatican. Sponsored by the Knights of Columbus, the Pittsburgh Symphony performed Mahler's Symphony No. 2 and the world premiere of John Harbison's motet, "Abraham." The concert was broadcast by PBS both online and on television and was also broadcast internationally.

2006 European Tour

The symphony went on tour in Europe from August 22 to September 6, 2006. Leonard Slatkin conducted the orchestra during the first half of the tour with performances in Dublin, Cardiff, at the BBC Proms in London, and in Patras, Greece. Hans Graf conducted the second half of the tour with performances in Hanover, Dortmund, Cologne and Düsseldorf. The tour was sponsored by the Mellon Financial Corporation, LANXESS and U.S. Steel Kosice S.R.O.

2008 250 Ambassador Tour of Europe

In celebration of the city of Pittsburgh's 250th anniversary, the Pittsburgh Symphony Orchestra toured Europe in January and February 2008. The Allegheny Conference accompanied the symphony to conduct corporate promotion of Pittsburgh. The orchestra performed in Spain, The Netherlands, Germany, Austria, Hungary and Croatia. The tour was sponsored by BNY Mellon, PPG Industries, LANNXESS and Meyer, Unkovic & Scott.

2009 Asia Tour

The Pittsburgh Symphony Orchestra's 2009 Asia Tour marked conductor Manfred Honeck's first international tour as music director and the orchestra's debut in Shanghai and Kaohsiung, Taiwan. The orchestra traveled to China and Taiwan from May 11 to 21, 2009, performing four concerts altogether, two at Beijing's National Centre for the Performing Arts, one at the Shanghai Oriental Arts Center, and one at the Kaohsiung Main Stadium. The tour was funded by the Henry L. Hillman Foundation and Westinghouse.

2009 European Festivals Tour

Director Manfred Honeck conducted the Pittsburgh Symphony on his first European tour from September 12–20, 2009. The orchestra performed in Essen, at Beethovenfest in Bonn, and at the Lucerne Summer Music Festival.

2010 European Tour

Director Manfred Honeck conducted the symphony during its European tour from May 12–30, 2010. The orchestra visited Switzerland, Luxembourg, Germany, France, the Czech Republic, Hungary, Slovenia and Austria with concerts in Basel, Stuttgart, Paris, Frankfurt, Luxembourg, Prague, Dresden, Vienna, Budapest and Ljubljana. The tour was sponsored by BNY Mellon and Westinghouse.

2010 Lanaudière Festival

Manfred Honeck conducted the Pittsburgh Symphony at the 2010 Lanaudière Festival in Montreal. The program included works by Beethoven, Mahler, Richard Strauss and Wagner.

2011 European Festivals Tour

Director Manfred Honeck conducted the symphony during its European Festivals tour from August 22 to September 12, 2011. The orchestra performed at festivals in Germany, Austria, Switzerland and England, and gave concerts in Paris and Vilnius, Lithuania. The festivals included the Rheingau Musik Festival in Wiesbaden, the Schleswig-Holstein Music Festival in Hamburg, Beethovenfest in Bonn and Musikfest in Berlin, as well as the BBC Proms in London, the Grafenegg Festival and the Lucerne Festival. The tour was sponsored by BNY Mellon.

2012 Lanaudière Festival

Manfred Honeck conducted the Pittsburgh Symphony at the 2012 Lanaudière Festival in Montreal. The orchestra performed works by Dvorak, Glinka and Tchaikovsky and featured cellist Johannes Moser.

2012 European Residency Tour

Director Manfred Honeck conducted the Pittsburgh Symphony Orchestra during its European Residency Tour from October 26 to November 10, 2012. During the tour, the orchestra took up a four-concert residency at the Musikverein in Vienna. The Pittsburgh Symphony is one of the few American orchestras to be honored with a residency at the Musikverein. The tour also included performances in Barcelona, Madrid, Paris, Cologne, Frankfurt, Stuttgart and Luxembourg. The program included works by Dvorak, Mahler, Mozart, Sibelius and Tchaikovsky.

2013 European Festivals Tour

Music Director Manfred Honeck returned with the Pittsburgh Symphony Orchestra to Europe for a tour of European Festivals. Concerts took place in Grafenegg, Berlin, Bucharest, Paris, Düsseldorf, Frankfurt, Lucerne and Bonn, and included soloist Anne-Sophie Mutter, Martin Grubinger and Yuja Wang.

Broadcasts

Previn and the Pittsburgh

Launched in 1977, "Previn and the Pittsburgh" was a series of specials produced by WQED-TV. The Alcoa Foundation sponsored the programs, which ran for three years and became the highest rated classical music series on PBS. The program showcased the diversity of Music Director Andre Previn's musical interests, talents and friends. The first program explored Mozart, with Previn and the Pittsburgh Symphony's Patricia Prattis Jennings playing four-handed piano sonatas. Others featured guest artists John Williams, conducting his music from "Star Wars" and "E.T.," Ella Fitzgerald, Yo-Yo Ma, Pittsburgh Symphony principal cello Nathaniel Rosen (the first American cellist to win the Gold Medal at the Tchaikovsky International Competition), composer Stephen Sondheim and violinist Itzhak Perlman. Composer Miklos Rosza appeared as a guest to hear the Pittsburgh Symphony play his Oscar-winning score for the movie "Ben-Hur." Previn displayed his considerable talent as a jazz pianist in a duet with his friend Oscar Peterson, the man Duke Ellington dubbed "the maharajah of the keyboard." When cameras came into Heinz Hall to film the Pittsburgh Symphony Orchestra rehearsing in their shirtsleeves, audiences saw a relaxed maestro in bellbottoms who obviously liked and respected the musicians. The first show aired on February 27, 1977 and within two days the Pittsburgh Symphony sold more than 2,500 additional seats.

Pittsburgh Symphony Radio

Launched in 1982, the Pittsburgh Symphony Radio program is hosted by Jim Cunningham of WQED-FM. It is a complete two-hour concert with Music Director Manfred Honeck and guest artists heard on over 100 PRI and NPR stations across the country. The Pittsburgh Symphony was first broadcast in 1936 when NBC Blue Network began a series of 26 half-hour radio broadcasts over the NBC Blue Network of more than 90 stations. The broadcasts were sponsored by Pittsburgh Plate Glass Company.

Heinz Hall history

Heinz Hall for the Performing Arts, dedicated in 1971 and renovated in 1995, is the cornerstone of the Cultural District of Pittsburgh. This cultural-entertainment focal point of the Golden Triangle has helped spur the continuing economic and cultural revitalization of downtown Pittsburgh. With its international reputation for grandeur and excellence as a concert hall and showplace, the 2,661-seat Heinz Hall is home of the Pittsburgh Symphony Orchestra.
The structure evolved from its origin in 1927 as the Loew's Penn Theater to its renovation and dedication as Heinz Hall for the Performing Arts in 1971—"a gift to the Pittsburgh Symphony Society from the Howard Heinz Endowment…to encourage, foster and perpetuate the performing arts in the Greater Pittsburgh area."

Each year more than a half-million patrons attend symphony concerts and other attractions, ranging from Pops concerts to children's concerts to national Broadway touring shows.

For 45 years prior to the origin of the Loew's Penn Theater, the building that stood at this location was the Hotel Anderson. From 1880 to 1925, this hotel provided both accommodations and entertainment. Before 1900 the hotel frequently housed traveling acting companies. The guest list ranged from visiting businessmen to Shakespearean actors. Prior to 1880 the name of the hotel was the St. Clair. Most probably Edwin Booth (1833–1893) and his acting company stayed at the St. Clair, or later at the Anderson Hotel, during their many tours across the United States. After 1900 the Anderson developed a somewhat seedy reputation, lost much of its appeal and met its demise.

Built on the same location as the Anderson, the Loew's Penn Theater was constructed in 1927. Motion picture magnate Marcus Loew hired the architectural firm of Rapp & Rapp to design the opulent movie house. Known as Pittsburgh's "Temple of the Cinema," the building was regarded as the most magnificent theater between New York and Chicago.

With the advent of television, declining attendance and the rising costs of maintaining such landmarks, the Penn Theater, in line with the nation's other great movie palaces, was forced to shut its doors in 1964. The Orchestra was searching for a new home, having outgrown Carnegie Music Hall and the Syria Mosque, and the economic advantages to recycling the well-constructed theater were clearly apparent. To explore the feasibility of using the building, Henry J. Heinz II and Charles Denby, president of the Pittsburgh Symphony Society, toured the old movie palace. Together they had the vision to look past the rundown interior and see that with proper restoration the Hall could be a brilliant cultural center. Along with Adolph W. Schmidt, President of the A. W. Mellon Educational and Charitable Trust, and Theodore L. Hazlett, Jr., representing the Allegheny Conference and the Urban Redevelopment Authority of Pittsburgh, these men worked with the architectural firm of Stotz, Hess, MacLachlan & Fosner to begin the construction."  A $10-million reconstruction of the theater took place between 1967 and 1971. Although much of the structure and décor remained the same, a new five-story wing was added to the back of the building. This wing expanded the stage and rehearsal space along with the music library and dressing rooms.

Several concerts took place before the remodel and reopening of the Hall in 1971, including a performance of works by Berlioz, Beethoven and Brahms by the Leonard Rose, Isaac Stern and Eugene Istomin Trio for the 1969 pension fund concert. Questionnaires filled out by symphony followers were collected after the concert and reflected an overwhelming support of the new venue.
 
Heinz Hall was dedicated in September 1971. The inaugural concerts took place on September 10 and 11 with William Steinberg conducting Beethoven's "Consecration of the House" overture and Mahler's Symphony No. 2 ("Resurrection") with a combined chorus of Pennsylvania State University choirs. The New York Times published an outstanding review of the performances, citing the improvement of the acoustics over previous Symphony venues saying, "Pittsburghers at last have the opportunity to hear (the orchestra) as it ought to sound."

The Garden Plaza and a four-story addition to the Hall were completed in 1982 by the firm of MacLachlan, Cornelius & Filoni. The plaza included a waterfall and sculpture by London-based artist Angela Connor. The addition to the Hall included two bar/lounge spaces as well as a dining and meeting room. In addition, some public areas were refurbished into reception facilities in 1988.

A $6.5-million renovation began in 1995 with funding provided by the Howard Heinz Endowment and Commonwealth of Pennsylvania Strategy 21 program funds. The renovation improved the acoustical, technical and aesthetic qualities of the Hall and was carried out by Architect Albert Filoni, of MacLachlan, Cornelius & Filoni, along with acoustician R. Lawrence Kirkegaard.  The Hall reopened with a ribbon cutting ceremony by Governor Tom Ridge and Teresa Heinz.

References

External links

 

1895 establishments in Pennsylvania
Musical groups established in 1895
Musical groups disestablished in 1910
Musical groups from Pittsburgh
Musical groups reestablished in 1926
Orchestras based in Pennsylvania